Race Car Simulator is a 1984 video game published by Creative Solutions.

Gameplay
Race Car Simulator is a game in which an overhead view of the racetrack and a view from the driver's eye are both available, and the game includes the option to design race tracks.

Reception
Frank C. Boosman reviewed the game for Computer Gaming World, and stated that "RCS is a good game, but needs some additional features."

References

1984 video games